The Monnaie de Paris (Paris Mint) is a government-owned institution responsible for producing France's coins. Founded in AD 864 with the Edict of Pistres, it is the world's oldest continuously running minting institution.

In 1973, the mint relocated its primary production to a facility in Pessac, and today the original facility in Paris, while still operational, functions primarily as a museum and is home to a collection of many ancient coins.

Monnaie de Paris acquired its autonomy and was granted legal personality by law no. 2006-1666.

Building in Paris

A Neoclassical edifice, the Hôtel de la Monnaie was designed by Jacques-Denis Antoine and built from 1767–1775 on the Left Bank of the Seine.  The Monnaie was the first major civic monument undertaken by Antoine, yet shows a high level of ingenuity on the part of the architect.  Today it is considered a key example of French Neoclassicism in pre-Revolutionary Paris.  The building is typified by its heavy external rustication and severe decorative treatment.  It boasts one of the longest façades on the Seine; its appearance has been likened to the Italian palazzo tradition. The building, which housed mint workshops, administrative rooms, and residential quarters, wraps around a large interior courtyard.  It remains open to the public and includes a numismatics museum, located within what was once the main foundry.

Development
The Monnaie de Paris employs 500 people (in 2010) on two sites: the Hôtel de la Monnaie in Paris (55% of the workforce) and the monetary establishment in Pessac, in Gironde (45%). In 2019, turnover amounted to 134 million euros for a workforce of 489 employees.

Following a 5-year renovation project known as Metalmetamorphose, the museum at the Monnaie de Paris – known as the Musée du Conti (11 Conti Museum) – was reopened on 30 September 2017.

See also 

List of museums in Paris
Napoleonic medal
Philippe Danfrie – Superintendent of the Mint in the late 16th century.
Pierre Marie François Ogé Bust of Jacques Denis Antoine
List of oldest companies

References 
Notes

Sources
Building the financial façade: Jacques-Denis Antoine's Hôtel de la Monnaie, the Parisian mint, 1765–1775

External links

Monnaie de Paris

Museums in Paris
Manufacturing companies based in Paris
Buildings and structures in the 6th arrondissement of Paris
Mints (currency)
Numismatic museums in France
864 establishments
9th-century establishments in France